Ostrá (meaning Sharp in Slovak) is a mountain in the Greater Fatra Range of Slovakia measuring . It has two very rugged summits with an excellent view over the Turiec Valley and the opposite Tlstá Mountain.

References 

Veľká Fatra
Mountains of Slovakia